Events from the year 1823 in France.

Incumbents
 Monarch – Louis XVIII
 Prime Minister – Joseph de Villèle

Events
22 January - By secret treaty signed at the Congress of Verona, the Quintuple Alliance gives France a mandate to invade Spain for the purpose of restoring Ferdinand VII (who has been captured by armed revolutionary liberals) as absolute monarch of the country.
7 April - French forces, the "Hundred Thousand Sons of Saint Louis", cross the Spanish border.
23 May - The rebel Spanish government withdraws from Madrid to Seville following French attacks.
31 August - Battle of Trocadero: French infantry capture the fort of Trocadero and turn its guns on Cádiz.
30 September - Cádiz surrenders to the French and Ferdinand VII of Spain is restored to his throne as absolute monarch.
5 November - The "Hundred Thousand Sons of Saint Louis" begin their withdrawal from Spain, although a French army of occupation remains in the country until 1828.

Arts and literature
The debut novel by Victor Hugo, Han d'Islande, is published.

Births

January to June
27 January - Édouard Lalo, composer (died 1892)
28 February - Ernest Renan, Biblical scholar, philosopher and writer (died 1892)
4 March - Casimir Marie Gaudibert, astronomer and selenographer (died 1901)
14 March - Théodore de Banville, poet and writer (died 1891)
18 March - Antoine Chanzy, general and governor of Algeria (died 1883)
21 March - Jules Émile Planchon, botanist (died 1888)
13 April - Charles Joseph Marty-Laveaux, literary scholar (died 1899)
21 June - Jean Chacornac, astronomer (died 1873)
28 June - Jules Adenis, dramatist and opera librettist (died 1900)

July to December
12 July - Jacques-Léonard Maillet, sculptor (died 1894)
18 July - Félix du Temple de la Croix, Army captain, aviation pioneer (died 1894)
8 August - Théodule Ribot, realist painter (died 1891)
15 August - Marie-Louis-Antoine-Gaston Boissier, classical scholar (died 1908)
1 September - Louis Gustave Ricard, painter (died 1873)
28 September - Alexandre Cabanel, painter (died 1889)
8 October - Louis-Frédéric Brugère, professor of apologetics and church history (died 1888)
21 October - Edme-Armand-Gaston d'Audiffret-Pasquier, politician (died 1905)
8 November - Joseph Monier, inventor (died 1906)
22 December - Jean Henri Fabre, entomologist (died 1915)

Full date unknown
Théodore Barrière, dramatist (died 1877)
Antoine Fauchery, photographer (died 1862)

Deaths

January to June
3 January - Jean Joseph Amable Humbert, general, led a failed invasion of Ireland (born 1755)
22 January - Jean-Pierre, Count of Montalivet, statesman and peer (born 1766)
16 February - Pierre Paul Prud'hon, painter and draughtsman (born 1758)
1 March - Pierre-Jean Garat, opera singer (born 1764)
14 March - Charles François Dumouriez, general (born 1739)
18 March - Jean-Baptiste Bréval, cellist and composer (born 1753)
27 March - Jacques-Michel Hurel de Lamare, cellist (born 1772)
1 June - Louis-Nicolas Davout, Marshal of France (born 1770)
27 June - Pierre Antoine Delalande, naturalist and explorer (born 1787)

July to December
2 August - Lazare Carnot, politician, engineer and mathematician (born 1753)
16 August - Louis-Martin Berthault, architect (born 1770)
18 August - André-Jacques Garnerin, inventor of the frameless parachute (born 1769)
22 August - Lazare Carnot, general, politician and mathematician (born 1753)
18 November - Jean-Nicolas Pache, politician (born 1746)

Full date unknown
Antoine-François Callet, painter (born 1741)

See also

References

1820s in France